Goeppertia libbyana (syn. Calathea libbyana) is a species of flowering plant in the family Marantaceae, endemic to Napo Province of Ecuador. Its natural habitat is subtropical or tropical moist lowland forests. It has gained the Royal Horticultural Society's Award of Garden Merit.

References

libbyana
Endangered plants
Endemic flora of Ecuador
Plants described in 2012
Taxonomy articles created by Polbot
Taxobox binomials not recognized by IUCN